Xanionotum is a genus of flies in the family Phoridae.

Species
X. bruchi (Borgmeier, 1924)
X. delicatum (Borgmeier, 1926)
X. hystrix Brues, 1902
X. mexicanum Borgmeier, 1932
X. nechystrix Disney, 2007
X. pilosum Borgmeier, 1932
X. scopifer Borgmeier, 1938
X. setulitibia Borgmeier, 1938
X. smithi Brues, 1936
X. sociatum Borgmeier, 1928
X. spiniceps (Borgmeier, 1923)
X. spinipes Borgmeier, 1928
X. spinosior (Borgmeier, 1926)
X. tarsale Borgmeier, 1968
X. wasmanni Schmitz, 1928

References

Phoridae
Platypezoidea genera